An omen is a phenomenon that is believed to foretell the future.

Omen(s) or The Omen may also refer to:

Fictional characters
 Omen (comics), or Lilith Clay, a DC Comics superheroine
 Omen (Dark Oracle), from the TV series Dark Oracle
 Omen, a member of The Legion of Night from Marvel Comics
 The Omen, a recurring antagonist in season 5 of Samurai Jack

Film and television
 The Omen (franchise), a horror film franchise
 The Omen, a 1976 film starring Gregory Peck and Lee Remick
 The Omen (2006 film), a remake of the 1976 film, starring Julia Stiles and Liev Schreiber
 Omen (2003 film), a Thai suspensse film

Music

Performers
 Omen (band), an American heavy metal band
 Omen (musician) (born 1982), American rapper and producer
 Omen (record producer) (born 1976), American producer and musician
 Thomas "The Omen" Stauch (born 1970), German drummer

Albums
 Omen (Antestor album), 2012
 Omen (Blutengel album), 2015
 Omen (Soulfly album), 2010
 Omen (The Story Continues...), by Magic Affair, 1994
 Omen (EP), by Within the Ruins, 2011
 An Omen EP, by How to Destroy Angels, 2012
 Omen - The Story, by Mysterious Art, or the title song, 1989
 Omens (3OH!3 album) or the title song, 2013
 Omens (Sorrowful Angels album) or the title song, 2012
 Omens (Lamb of God album), or the title song, 2022

Songs
 "Omen" (Disclosure song), 2015
 "Omen" (Orbital song), 1990
 "Omen" (The Prodigy song), 2009
 "Omen", by Kim Petras from Turn Off the Light, Vol. 1, 2018
 "The Omen", by Heaven Shall Burn from Invictus (Iconoclast III), 2010

Places
 Omen, Texas, US
 Merkaz Omen, or Omen, a settlement in Israel

Other uses
 Omen (ancient Rome), a sign intimating the future
 Omen (Star Wars novel), a 2009 Fate of the Jedi novel by Christie Golden
 HP Omen, a line of gaming computer by HP

See also
 
 
 Oman (disambiguation)